Qeshlaq-e Qarah Baghlu (also Romanized as Qeshlāq-e Qarah Bāghlū) is a village in Qeshlaq Rural District, Abish Ahmad District, Kaleybar County, East Azerbaijan Province, Iran. At the 2006 census, its population was 173, in 34 families. The village is populated by the Kurdish Chalabianlu tribe.

References 

Populated places in Kaleybar County
Kurdish settlements in East Azerbaijan Province